Daniel Alejandro Delfino (born June 1, 1970 in Temperley) is a retired football striker from Argentina, who played for several clubs in South America during his career.

Club career
Delfino emerged from the youth ranks of Club Atlético Banfield. On October 1, 1988 he made his debut with El Taladro in a 2-0 victory over Chacarita. In 1991, he was loaned to first division club Quilmes. After six months playing for the cerveceros, Delfino returned to Banfield and helped the club gain promotion to the Argentine Primera in 1992. Later, he transferred to Rosario Central where he played during 1994. The following year he made his third and last spell with Banfield, playing for the club until the Clausura '96. From there, Delfino went to spend some years in second division making appearances for San Martín de Tucumán, Atlanta and Sportivo Italiano.

In 1999, he moved to Bolivia where he played for Unión Central before signing with The Strongest in 2000. With the atigrados Delfino finished as the topscorer in the Liga de Fútbol Profesional Boliviano with 28 goals that year. In July 2001, he relocated to Venezuela and joined Deportivo Táchira. After two years he transferred to Ecuadorian club Deportivo Cuenca where he had a brief stint before returning to Táchira. In 2003 Delfino moved to Carabobo FC where he played for the next five years. Finally in 2008 he made his last run with Deportivo Italia, retiring from football at age 37.

Honours

References
 Delfino profile

External links
 Argentine Primera statistics

1970 births
Living people
Argentine footballers
Argentine expatriate footballers
Association football forwards
Club Atlético Banfield footballers
Quilmes Atlético Club footballers
Rosario Central footballers
Club Atlético Atlanta footballers
The Strongest players
Expatriate footballers in Bolivia
Expatriate footballers in Venezuela
C.D. Cuenca footballers
Expatriate footballers in Ecuador
Deportivo Táchira F.C. players
Deportivo Italia players
Argentine expatriate sportspeople in Venezuela
Argentine expatriate sportspeople in Bolivia
Argentine Primera División players
Bolivian Primera División players
Venezuelan Primera División players
Unión Tarija players
Sportspeople from Buenos Aires Province